Stenoptilia admiranda is a moth of the family Pterophoridae. It is known from Japan (Honshu).

The length of the forewings is 11–12 mm.

External links
Taxonomic and Biological Studies of Pterophoridae of Japan (Lepidoptera)
Japanese Moths

admiranda
Moths of Japan
Moths described in 1963